Václav Nedorost (born March 16, 1982) is a Czech former professional ice hockey center. He played in the National Hockey League with the Colorado Avalanche, who selected him 14th overall at the 2000 NHL Entry Draft, and the Florida Panthers between 2001 and 2004. The rest of his career, which lasted from 1998 to 2019, was spent in the Czech Extraliga and the Kontinental Hockey League. Internationally Nedorost played for the Czech national junior team, and won the gold medal at the 2000 and 2001 World Junior Championships.

Playing career
Nedorost was drafted in the first round, 14th overall, by the Colorado Avalanche in the 2000 NHL Entry Draft. Drafted out of HC České Budějovice of the Czech Extraliga, Nedorost made his North American debut with Colorado's American Hockey League affiliate, the Hershey Bears, in the 2001–02 season.  He also appeared in 25 NHL games for the Avalanche during the 2001–02 season, scoring two goals and two assists.  Nedorost appeared in 42 more games for the Avalanche in the 2002–03 season.

On July 19, 2003, before the 2003–04 season Nedorost was traded by Colorado, along with Eric Messier, to the Florida Panthers for Peter Worrell and a 2nd round selection. He appeared in 32 games for the Panthers that season.

During the 2004–05 NHL lockout, Nedorost went to the Czech Republic to play for HC Bílí Tygři Liberec of the Czech Extraliga. After not playing the following season due to injury, Nedorost then signed for HC České Budějovice in the 2006–07 season before returning to HC Bílí Tygři Liberec the following season.

On May 19, 2010, Nedorost signed a one-year contract with Russian team, Metallurg Novokuznetsk, of the KHL.

Nedorost enjoyed two successful seasons with HC Donbass before civil unrest in Ukraine suspended Donbass' participation in the KHL. Nedorost as a free agent agreed to a one-year contract with Slovakian KHL competitor, HC Slovan Bratislava on August 4, 2014.

Returning to the Czech Extraliga for the 2018–19 season, Nedorost played his 19th and last professional year with HC Plzeň, notching 6 points in 14 playoff games before announcing his retirement on May 1, 2019.

Executive career
Nedorost immediately embarked on a managerial career, accepting an assistant sporting director role working under former Avalanche draft pick and teammate, Radim Vrbata, at BK Mladá Boleslav of the Extraliga on May 1, 2019.

Career statistics

Regular season and playoffs

International

References

External links

1982 births
Living people
HC Bílí Tygři Liberec players
Motor České Budějovice players
Colorado Avalanche draft picks
Colorado Avalanche players
Czech ice hockey centres
HC Donbass players
Czech expatriate sportspeople in Ukraine
Florida Panthers players
Hershey Bears players
Metallurg Novokuznetsk players
National Hockey League first-round draft picks
Sportspeople from České Budějovice
HC Plzeň players
San Antonio Rampage players
HC Slovan Bratislava players
Czech expatriate ice hockey players in the United States
Czech expatriate ice hockey players in Russia
Czech expatriate ice hockey players in Slovakia
Expatriate ice hockey players in Ukraine